Verities & Balderdash is the fourth studio album by the American singer/songwriter Harry Chapin, released in 1974. (see 1974 in music). "Cat's in the Cradle" was Chapin's highest-charting single, finishing at number 38 for the year on the 1974 Billboard year-end Hot 100 chart. The follow-up single, "I Wanna Learn a Love Song," charted on the Billboard Hot 100 Singles Chart at number 44, and Billboard Adult Contemporary at number 7. A promotional single, "What Made America Famous?", was released to radio stations as a 45 rpm single. The album was certified Gold on December 17, 1974.

The album was advertised with the slogan: "As only Harry can tell it."

Track listing
All tracks written by Harry Chapin, except where noted.

Personnel 
Band
Harry Chapin - guitar, lead vocals
John Tropea - acoustic guitar, sitar
Don Payne - bass
Allan Schwartzberg - drums
Don Grolnick - piano, electric piano, harpsichord
Ron Bacchiocchi - synthesizer
Irving Spice - concertmaster
George Simms - background vocals
Frank Simms - background vocals
Dave Kondziela - background vocals
Zizi Roberts - female vocals
Production
Ron Bacchiocchi - recording engineer
Paul Leka - mixing
Fred Kewley - mixing
Glen Christensen - art direction
Bill Hofman - illustration
Ruth Bernal - photography
Shiah Grumet - design

Charts and certifications

Weekly charts

Year-end charts

Certifications

References

Harry Chapin albums
1974 albums
Albums produced by Paul Leka
Elektra Records albums